Ocypel  is a village in the administrative district of Gmina Lubichowo, within Starogard County, Pomeranian Voivodeship, in northern Poland.

The village has a population of 585.

History

The village was mentioned for the first time in 1664. From 1772 it was the administrative headquarters of the Prussian partition in the Prussian province of West Prussia. After the First World War Ocypel found itself again in Poland. During World War II the village was called Reußberg. In 1944, soldiers of the underground shot the deputy chief of the secret German state police Gestapo from Tczew in Ocypel. In the German retaliation (by the order of the then chief of the Gestapo in Gdansk), more than twenty Poles were shot publicly (residents of Ocypel and surrounding areas, as well as members of the AK (Armia Krajowa = Home Army) intelligence network from Pomerania, brought from the Stutthof concentration camp). During the German occupation in 1944 in the forests surrounding the Ocypel there was a clash of Pomeranian M4 troops with German troops. After World War II, the forest areas of the Tucholskie Forests around the Ocypla became the operational area of the anti-communist guerillas.

For further details of the history of the region, see History of Pomerania.

Tourism

In Ocypel, especially on the shores of Large Ocypel Lake, there are many resorts. The biggest one is the Scouts Summer Camp, ZHP Warszawa Praga-Południe.

References

Ocypel